Meynbach is a river of northeastern Germany. It flows from its source near Hühnerland in a generally western direction along the border between Brandenburg and Mecklenburg-Vorpommern. It flows into the Alte Elde near Krinitz. A branch of the Meynbach flows from Hühnerland to the east, and joins the Tarnitz north of Reckenzin.

See also
 List of rivers of Brandenburg
 List of rivers of Mecklenburg-Vorpommern

Rivers of Brandenburg
Rivers of Mecklenburg-Western Pomerania
Rivers of Germany